Steven A. Tolman (born October 2, 1954 in Brighton, Massachusetts) is an American labor union leader who is the current President of the Massachusetts AFL–CIO. He is a former state legislator who served in the Massachusetts Senate (1999–2011), representing the 2nd Suffolk and Middlesex district, and the Massachusetts House of Representatives (1994–1998). Prior to serving in the Massachusetts legislature he was a commissioner for the Watertown Housing Authority and a member of the Democratic State Committee.

He was elected President of the Massachusetts AFL–CIO on October 6, 2011. He remained in the State Senate until October 13, 2011, following the vote on the casino gambling bill.

Tolman is a resident of the Brighton neighborhood in Boston and is a member of the Democratic Party. He is the brother of former state senator Warren Tolman.

See also
 Massachusetts House of Representatives' 18th Suffolk district

References

1954 births
Living people
Democratic Party Massachusetts state senators
Democratic Party members of the Massachusetts House of Representatives
American trade union leaders
University of Massachusetts Boston alumni
Politicians from Boston